Solute carrier family 16 member 12 is a protein that in humans is encoded by the SLC16A12 gene.

Function

This gene encodes a transmembrane transporter that likely plays a role in monocarboxylic acid transport. A mutation in this gene has been associated with juvenile cataracts with microcornea and renal glucosuria. [provided by RefSeq, Mar 2010].

References

Further reading